Julian Christopher Hill (born 4 June 1973) is an Australian politician who is currently serving as the Member of Parliament for Bruce in the House of Representatives, and was previously the 4th Mayor of Port Phillip. A member of the Australian Labor Party (ALP), he succeeded Alan Griffin at the 2016 federal election.

Hill is the Deputy Chair of the Australian Parliament's Joint Statutory Committee of Public Accounts and Audit. This Committee oversees the Commonwealth Auditor-General, the Parliamentary Budget Office and interrogates the Australian Government's expenditure, performance and financial statements.

Before entering Parliament, Hill was the youngest councilor elected to the City of Port Phillip in 1999, and in 2000 became the City's youngest Mayor, serving two terms from 2000 to 2002. Hill was re-elected to serve another term as Councilor of the City in 2002 and served until 2005. Hill then forged a senior executive career in the Victorian Public Service, serving under Labor and Liberal Governments.

In his first speech Hill stated: "I am conscious that as a Rainbow Labor member my election is a very small step to adding to the diversity of this parliament, and I am proud to see more LGBTI Australians in this parliament than the last." He is a member of Labor's Left faction. Hill has championed Australian multiculturalism and spoken up about the importance of Australia embracing its human diversity to ensure future success; whether that be on the grounds of race, gender, sexuality or religion.

Early life and education
Julian Christopher Hill grew up in the east Melbourne suburb of Burwood and attended Wesley College from 1985 to 1990. He obtained Bachelor of Science (chemistry) and Bachelor of Laws degrees from Monash University in 2000, and a Graduate Certificate of International Relations from Deakin University in 2015.

He became a graduate member of the Australian Institute of Company Directors, and was elected a Fellow of the Institute of Public Administration Australia in 2012.

Personal life 
Hill has spoken of being raised by his mother, after the death of his father, a medical doctor, when he was 4-years-old. He has described how his mother, a nurse and midwife by profession, instilled in him the values of "responsibility, hard work and compassion." Hill spoke in Parliament, during National Palliative Care Week, about "the enormous privilege and authentic human experience" he had nursing his mother at home for the 10 months before her death, after she was diagnosed with an incurable cancer in 2008.

Hill campaigned for amendment to Australian prescription drug laws following an incident in 2017 which left his daughter Elanor with a 64 cm blood clot after she was prescribed the oral contraceptive, Diane-35, to use as an acne medication, which is not approved by the Therapeutic Goods Administration.

Hill's brother and only sibling was the actor and independent filmmaker Damian Hill, best known for writing and acting in the 2016 film Pawno. Damian died on 22 September 2018. Julian Hill presented the inaugural Damian Hill Independent Film Award, named in honor of his brother, at the 2019 Melbourne International Film Festival. Hill is gay, and has spoken of two former long-term partners, Lorien and David.

Career
Hill started his career as an electorate officer and adviser for his predecessor Alan Griffin in 1995. From 2002 until his election to parliament in 2016, he worked as a senior public servant for the Victorian Government in the Departments of Transport, Sustainability and Environment, Planning and Community Development, and Economic Development, Jobs, Transport and Resources.

Councilor and mayor of Port Phillip 
In 1999 Hill was elected a councilor of the City of Port Phillip and re-elected for a second term in 2002. In 2000 he was elected as the youngest ever mayor of the city at the age of 25 and served two terms.
 
As mayor, Hill led the city through a period of enormous and rapid change, including a development boom as inner city bayside suburbs rapidly gentrified. Hill led high-profile initiatives in the municipality which generated metropolitan attention, including transport planning, parking management, complex social policy reforms and the Greening Port Phillip program. As mayor, Hill signed the first friendship agreement between an Australian local government and an East Timorese town. Founded on the principles of community development, the Friends of Suai celebrated its 20th year in 2020.

In 2000, an article in The Age stated that " far from hiding his light in local government Hill is fast becoming the most outspoken Mayor in Melbourne." Questioned about being a young high-profile councilor and mayor, Hill commented that "[t]here is something insidious about saying, 'Aren't you too young to be doing this job?' It is the other end of the scale from saying, 'Oh, you're 60, your brain must be soft.'"

Health policy - drug use treatment and law reform advocacy 
Hill was a strong advocate for the establishment of a supervised injecting center in St Kilda, Melbourne. Hill has continued his advocacy for reform in the Federal Parliament where he spoke his strong conviction that "[d]rug addiction is a health issue" that "must be treated like a health issue, like other health issues. The evidence is clear: making it a moral issue does not help. It might make you feel good in your Liberal party room meeting, in government, but it doesn't actually help anyone in the community suffering from addiction. Addiction cuts across every class and hits every suburb and every family in this country."

In a speech to the House of Representatives a year later, Hill reflected on his experience in his mid-20s "as the mayor and leader of an inner-city council where the heroin epidemic saw people dying every day, every week around the city, in shops, in front yards, in laneways. The evidence then remains true: criminalizing or demonizing someone's addiction, whether or not they need income support, doesn't actually help."

Member for Bruce in the Australian Parliament 
Hill was elected in 2016 with a swing of + 2.28%.

In 2018, as part of a redistribution altering electoral boundaries, media reports suggested Hill was the biggest beneficiary. He was subsequently reelected in 2019 In 2023, Hill made a speech in Parliament that was partially written by OpenAI's ChatGPT. In the speech, Hill commented on the potentially destructive elements of the technology, stating that it had the ability to cause mass destruction.

Australian head of state 
Hill made it clear in his maiden speech he held strong views against the monarchy. In December 2019, he addressed the chamber on the issue, stating that when he was first elected it was a confronting moment for him to take an oath of allegiance to a foreigner. He spoke of feeling like a cheap traitor, going as far as stating that he crossed his fingers when taking his oath of allegiance.

See also

Members of the Australian House of Representatives, 2016–2019

References

External links 

 Official website

1973 births
Living people
Australian Labor Party members of the Parliament of Australia
Members of the Australian House of Representatives for Bruce
Members of the Australian House of Representatives
South Australian local councillors
Australian public servants
Labor Left politicians
Place of birth missing (living people)
LGBT legislators in Australia
21st-century Australian politicians
Politicians from Melbourne
Monash University alumni
Mayors of places in Victoria (Australia)
People educated at Wesley College (Victoria)
Deakin University alumni